Bo "Bosse" Ingvar Karchimirer Ringholm (born 18 August 1942) is a Swedish Social Democratic politician. He held the titles of Minister of Finance, Deputy Prime Minister, Minister for Policy Coordination, and Minister for Sport in the Persson administration.

Career 
Ringholm was born in Falköping, a town in the west of Sweden, and grew up in a working-class family. He lacks higher education, and dropped out of high school after failing both Maths and English. Like many Swedish Social Democratic politicians of his generation, Ringholm started his political career in the Swedish Social Democratic Youth League, an organisation he led 1967–1972. As chairman of the Social Democratic Youth League, Ringholm was known for his radical left-wing views. Among other things, he advocated the nationalization of private-owned Swedish bank institutions and Swedish economic support to the National Front for the Liberation of South Vietnam (FNL), the government of North Vietnam, the Pathet Lao in Laos and the Khmer Rouge in Cambodia.

After stepping down from chairman of SSU, Ringholm worked as a political adviser at the Ministries of the Interior and Labour. He also became active in the local politics of Stockholm. From 1973 he was a member of the Stockholm County Council, and two years later he was elected to the executive committee of the Stockholm party branch. In 1976 he became a director at the Ministry of Education and Science, and worked in the government administration until he became Transportation Commissioner of the Stockholm County from 1983. From 1997 he was the director-general of the Swedish Labour Market Board (AMS), until Prime Minister Göran Persson unexpectedly named him to succeed Erik Åsbrink as Minister for Finance in 1999.

On 21 October 2004 Göran Persson announced a restructuring of his government, in which Ringholm was moved from the Ministry of Finance to become Deputy Prime Minister, Minister for Policy Coordination and Minister for Sport. The reason cited by Persson was Ringholm was not interested in continuing as Minister of Finance following the coming 2006 general elections. His successor was Pär Nuder.

Following the resignation of Laila Freivalds on 21 March 2006, Ringholm was temporarily acting as Minister for Foreign Affairs until 27 March, when he was replaced by Carin Jämtin who also held the post temporarily until the new Minister for Foreign Affairs, Jan Eliasson, took office on 24 April.

Private 
Although Ringholm's given name is Bo, he is almost always referred to as "Bosse", the common Swedish nickname for Bo - even in formal circumstances. He is a teetotaller. He is also known for his great interest in sports and was the chair of Enskede sports club for 15 years until he declared he was going to step down when he became Minister for Sport. His involvement in the club has been far from unproblematic. In the summer of 2004, it was discovered that the club had neglected to pay taxes related to the sale of ad space. Ringholm denied any knowledge of this but promised that the taxes were going to be paid. A few months later the Swedish national public radio aired a news story claiming that Enskede sports club had made payments to trainers without reporting them to tax authorities, prompting the Swedish National Tax Board to investigate the matter. Ringholm, however, denied the allegations.

References 

|-

|-

|-

|-

|-

|-

|-

|-

1942 births
Deputy Prime Ministers of Sweden
Living people
Municipal commissioners of Sweden
Swedish Ministers for Finance
Swedish Ministers for Foreign Affairs
Swedish Social Democratic Party politicians
Members of the Riksdag 2002–2006